This is a list of Honorary Fellows of Fitzwilliam College, Cambridge. A list of current honorary fellows is published on the college's website at Honorary Fellows

 Dame Sarah Asplin
 Sir Peter Bazalgette
 Humphrey Burton
 Sir Dennis Byron
 Alan Cuthbert
 Sir Angus Deaton
 Peter Haggett
 Brian F. G. Johnson
 Juan Carlos I of Spain
 Sir David Kitchin
M. S. Swaminathan

References

Honorary Fellows

Fellows of Fitzwilliam College, Cambridge
Fitzwilliam College, Cambridge
Fitzwilliam